The Hawthorns station is a railway station and tram stop, opened in 1995 in Smethwick, near Birmingham, West Midlands, England. The station shares its name with the local football ground, The Hawthorns, the home of West Bromwich Albion F.C., which it serves. There is a Park and ride facility at the tram stop.

History

Between 1931 and 1968, The Hawthorns Halt partly occupied the site of the current station, opened by the Great Western Railway on their London (Paddington) to Birkenhead via Birmingham (Snow Hill) line. It served football specials only, and had minimal facilities, as such it was not deemed worthy of 'station' status. It consisted of three platforms: platform 3 catering for return travel to Stourbridge, with platforms 1 and 2 being sited the other side of Halfords Lane.

The present station was opened in 1995, as part of the "Jewellery Line" project to restore services to Birmingham Snow Hill, this time it opened as a fully fledged station with regular services on the cross-city Snow Hill Lines. In 1999 the Midland Metro tram line opened between Birmingham and Wolverhampton, adding two tram platforms alongside the two railway platforms.

Its passenger numbers are assisted with free parking and its close proximity to Junction 1 of the M5. Pedestrian and vehicular access is via Halfords Lane.

Outside the main station entrance is a sculpture called "Aspire" by Anuradha Patel.

Services

Train
Most trains are operated by West Midlands Railway. The Monday to Saturday daytime service sees trains approximately every 10 minutes in each direction, operating between Stourbridge Junction, Birmingham Snow Hill, and either Dorridge or Whitlocks End. Many trains continue beyond Stourbridge to Kidderminster, Worcester Foregate Street or Great Malvern, and some continue beyond Whitlocks End or Dorridge to Stratford-upon-Avon.  Extra services are laid on around the time of football matches to assist fans in travelling to and from the match.

Four Chiltern trains call at The Hawthorns in each direction.

Metro
West Midlands Metro services operate at frequent intervals, between Library and Wolverhampton St Georges. Mondays to Fridays, West Midlands Metro services in each direction between Birmingham and Wolverhampton run at six to eight-minute intervals during the day, and at fifteen-minute intervals during the evenings and on Sundays. They run at eight minute intervals on Saturdays.

References

Further reading

External links

Rail Around Birmingham and the West Midlands: The Hawthorns station

West Midlands Metro stops
Railway stations in Sandwell
DfT Category E stations
Former Great Western Railway stations
Railway stations in Great Britain opened in 1931
Railway stations in Great Britain closed in 1968
Railway stations opened by Railtrack
Railway stations in Great Britain opened in 1995
Railway stations served by Chiltern Railways
Railway stations served by West Midlands Trains
West Bromwich
Reopened railway stations in Great Britain